Sir Gilbert Alexander "Gibby" Cooper CBE ED (31 July 1903 – 29 May 1989) was a businessman and politician in Bermuda, serving as a member of the House of Assembly and Mayor of Hamilton, Bermuda.  After graduating from McGill University with a degree in commerce, he worked for his family's business, A.S. Cooper & Sons Ltd., a department store in Front Street, Bermuda, where he later became chairman of the board of directors.<ref name="The Royal Gazette">The Royal Gazette</ref>

Cooper joined the Bermuda Volunteer Rifle Corps in 1921, becoming an officer in 1928, and served during the Second World War at Prospect Camp on the island.  In 1944 he became chairman of the Chamber of Commerce and was appointed to the Trade Development Board.  He served as a member of the House of Assembly from 1948 to 1968, and as chairman of its Finance Committee from 1959 to 1968.  He was Mayor of Hamilton from 1963 to 1972, when he was awarded a knighthood for public services.Supplement to the London Gazette

References

External links
 The Royal Gazette. "Family effort leads to success". 3 June 1997 Retrieved 11 November 2010.
 Supplement to the London Gazette''. p. 6256, 23 May 1972. Retrieved 12 November 2010.

1903 births
1989 deaths
20th-century Bermudian businesspeople
Commanders of the Order of the British Empire
Knights Bachelor
Mayors of Hamilton, Bermuda
Members of the House of Assembly of Bermuda
People from Hamilton, Bermuda
Bermudian expatriates in Canada